Asiascape is a monotypic genus of Middle Eastern funnel weavers containing the single species, Asiascape parthica. It was first described by Alireza Zamani and Yuri M. Marusik in 2020, and it has only been found in Iran.

See also
 List of Agelenidae species

References

Monotypic Agelenidae genera
Arthropods of Iran